Slouka is a Czech masculine surname, its feminine counterpart is Slouková. The surname may refer to
Mark Slouka (born 1958), American novelist and essayist of Czech origin
Hubert Slouka, Czech astronomer
 3423 Slouka, a minor planet named after Hubert

Czech-language surnames